Schabelitz is a surname. Notable people with the surname include:

 Jakob Lukas Schabelitz (1827–1899), Swiss bookseller and publisher
 R. F. Schabelitz (1884–1959), American writer, illustrator, comics artist, and painter